Procurement software is a type of business software which helps to automate the organisational purchasing functions.

Software functions include issuing and evaluating tenders, raising and approving purchase orders, selecting and ordering the product or service, receiving and matching the invoice and order, and payment of invoices, enabling the procurement department to see everything that is ordered, ensure that nothing can be ordered without correct approvals, and secure the best value by combining several orders for the same type of good or even getting suppliers to bid for the business. A buying organisation's choice of software may be driven by the particular strengths offered by each individual system and the number of vendors available through them. A multinational or other large organization will use a shared procurement system to take advantage of economies of scale to drive down the cost of purchases. Whilst some services are available to purchase through automated systems, the key strength of these systems lies in the procurement of commodities that are much easier to standardize.

Benefits
The key benefit for organisations using procurement software include ease of administration, access to information, and potential long-term cost savings. Having a single interface for procurement related management information cuts down the time and effort required to monitor organisational spending. The use of such software also allows procurement managers to control the vendors used by the wider organisation so all employees take advantage of negotiated rates and other terms of service. Notable companies in the market include GEP SMART, Oracle, SAP, Coupa, Basware, Infor and Workday.

Common features of procurement software systems 

 Requisitions – Creation of a purchase order with line items to be fulfilled by a vendor. Automated sending via fax or email.
 Vendor follow up – Automated, or reminders to follow up with vendors to confirm purchase orders.
 Receiving of goods or services – Maintaining a physical inventory of goods.
 Financial settlement – Creation of financial and/or inventory-related transactions as goods are physically received.
 Document management system – To archive relevant documents. 
 Electronic signature – Tool to sign documents online.

References

Further reading 
 Olson, N. (2010). Taken for Granted - The Construction of Order in the Process of Library Management System Decision Making (Vol. 45). Göteborg / Borås: Valfrid publishing.
 Global Trade Review (2009). Trade Services & the Supply Chain

Business software